S. fruticosus may refer to:
 Siphocampylus fruticosus, a plant species endemic to Ecuador
 Smallanthus fruticosus, a plant species